Crossocheilus gnathopogon is a species of ray-finned fish in the genus Crossocheilus. It is native to Sumatra.

References

Crossocheilus
Fish described in 1916